The National Republican Party was a political party in the United States 1824–1834.

National Republican Party may also refer to:

National Republican Party (Costa Rica), 1901–1952
National Republican Party (El Salvador), 1930–1931
National Republican Party (Guyana), 1990–2000
National Republican Party (Portugal), 1918–1923
National Republican Party of Russia, 1990–1998
National Republican Party (Spain), 1895–1897